The Jamia Mosque Khudabad known as Badshahi Mosque, is situated in Khudabad, Dadu District of Sindh the province of Pakistan. The mosque was built during the reign of Yar Muhammad Kalhoro between 1700 and 1718. It is situated in Khudabad Village almost  from the south of Dadu District. The mosque served as a school as well as for military training.

Gallery

See also 
List of mosques in Pakistan

References

External links
Kalhoro dynasty mosque faces threat of collapse Dawn January 2, 2013

Mosques
Mosques in Sindh
Religious buildings and structures completed in 1718
1718 establishments in Asia
Khudabad
Indo-Islamic architecture